Mehdi Residential Housing ( – Menāzl Meskūnī Tīp ol Mehdī) is a village in Jolgah Rural District, in the Central District of Jahrom County, Fars Province, Iran. At the 2006 census, its population was 526, in 127 families.

References 

Populated places in Jahrom County